Nobis may refer to:

 Nobis (bishop) (fl. 9th century), a bishop of St David's

People with the surname
 Johann Nobis (born 1899), Austrian conscientious objector
 Jörg Nobis (born 1975), German politician
 Julia Nobis (born 1992), Australian fashion model
 Tommy Nobis (born 1943), former American football player

See also
Nobi, a Korean word for a system of servitude in place between the 4th and 19th centuries
Nōbi Plain, large plain in Japan covering an area of approximately 
Non nobis, a short Latin hymn used as a prayer of thanksgiving and expression of humility